Jeena may refer to:

Films
 Jeena Jeena
 Humne Jeena Seekh Liya
 Jeena Yahan
 Jeena Isi Ka Naam Hai (film)
 Maine Jeena Seekh Liya
 Jeena Sirf Merre Liye
 Jeena Hai Toh Thok Daal
 Jeena Marna Tere Sang
 Tere Bina Kya Jeena
 Jeena Teri Gali Mein (2013 film)

Other
 P. S. Jeena, Indian basketballer
 Surendra Singh Jeena, Indian politician
 Jeena Shin, New Zealand artist born in Seoul, South Korea
 Jeena Teri Gali Mein, a musical
 Jeena Isi Ka Naam Hai, a talk show
 Jeena, the Cantonese pronunciation of the derogatory word Shina